William Yardley (1632 – 6 May 1693) was an early settler of Bucks County, Pennsylvania, and is the namesake of the borough of Yardley, Pennsylvania. As a persecuted Quaker minister, Yardley and his wife, Jane (nee Heath) moved from Ransclough, England, near Leek, Staffordshire, to Bucks County when Yardley was 50.

The family arrived on September 28, 1682, on the ship Friend's Adventure with their children, Thomas, Enoch, and William, and a servant, Andrew Heath (1667-1720). Yardley subsequently purchased  of land in Lower Makefield Township in Bucks County from William Penn, who had received the land from Charles II of England to settle a debt owed Penn's father. Yardley named his tract "Prospect Farm". He served as a justice of the peace for Bucks County and became a member of the Provincial Council.

After Yardley died in a smallpox epidemic in 1693, his nephew, Thomas Yardley, arrived from England in 1694 to manage the holdings. Through marriage, nephew Thomas added land to Yardley's former holdings and had ten children.

History
William Yardley was born in 1632 in Ransclough, England, located in Staffordshire.  He was raised as an agriculturist, but associated with the mystic religious community in Renaissance England called the Family of Love.

When Yardley was 15, English Dissenter George Fox began preaching an unusual and uncompromising approach to English Puritanism. This led to the founding of the Religious Society of Friends, also called the Quakers, a year later in 1648. In 1656, at the age of 23, Yardley began preaching on behalf of the Quakers. Two years later, he became a Quaker minister. Over the next twenty-five years, Yardley preached throughout England and was imprisoned several times along with many other Quakers, including William Penn. In one harsh imprisonment, Yardley's only resting place for three months was the bare, unheated floor of his cell.

In March 1681, Penn founded the Province of Pennsylvania as a primary refuge for persecuted English Quakers. Yardley was an uncle of one of Penn's most trusted friends and counselors, Phineas Pemberton. With plans to leave England, Yardley made an agreement with Penn to buy  for ten pounds (about nineteen U.S. dollars). At the age of 50 in 1682, Yardley and wife Jane (nee Heath), sons Enoch, William and Thomas, and servant Andrew Heath sailed to the America on the ship Friend's Adventure. On the ship, Yardley brought with him 2 bundles, 2 tubs, 3 chests, 1 pack, 2 boxes qty. 2 cwt. wrought iron, 1/2 cwt. pewter, 30 lbs, woolen cloth, 100 ells English linen, 40 lbs. new shoes, 2 cwt. nails; 1/2 chest window glass, 1/2 cwt. haberdashery wares.

On arriving in America, Yardley became the first person named "Yardley" to immigrate into America. The family eventually made their way to Falls, Bucks County, Pennsylvania, arriving there on September 28, 1682. Penn gave Yardley a warranty deed on October 6, 1682, and the land officially became Yardley's about five years later on January 23, 1687, through a land patent.

By the end of 1682, Yardley built his farmhouse on what is now called Yardley Dolington Road, about a mile from Yardley, Pennsylvania. He called his farmhouse and adjoining  of land "Prospect Farm." In 1683, Yardley presided over the marriage of Richard Hough, one of the first marriages among the English settlers. In addition, Yardley almost immediately took a prominent part in the affairs of the Province of Pennsylvania.

Over the next ten years, Yardley signed one of the frames of Pennsylvania's Great Charter, represented Bucks County in the first Pennsylvania Provincial Assembly, and was a member of the Executive Council of the Province of Pennsylvania. Yardley died on May 6, 1693, at the age of 61 as a result of a smallpox epidemic. Thomas Janney (1633–1696), Yardley's brother-in-law, wrote of him, about the time of his death: "He was a man of sound mind and good understanding."

After death
The tract of William Yardley covered the site of Yardley, and, after his death, his son Thomas established a ferry there, called "Yardley's ferry," which the Pennsylvania Provincial Assembly confirmed to him in 1722. The ferry sometimes was called Howell's ferry since that was the name of the ferry kept on the New Jersey side of the Delaware River. Yardley's ferry soon after became an important point, and, later in the 18th century, when the three great roads leading to Philadelphia, via the Falls, Four Lanes end (now Langhorne), and Newtown terminated there, the ferry became a thoroughfare of travel and traffic for a large section of East Jersey.

Yardley's wife Jane and their three sons, Enoch, William and Thomas, died in 1702–03 due to the a smallpox epidemic. As a result, Yardley's property in America reverted to his heirs in England, namely Yardley's brother Thomas and nephews, Thomas and Samuel, sons of Thomas. In 1694, Thomas, the younger son of Thomas (brother) and nephew to Yardley, came over with power of attorney to settle the estate. "Prospect Farm" became his property by purchase, and he settled in Lower Makefield Township, Pennsylvania, spending his life in Pennsylvania, 12 month, 1706. Through his marriage to the daughter of William Biles, a prominent Provincial Judge, Assemblyman and Councilman, and the siring of ten children, nephew Thomas combined the properties of his uncle, William Yardley, and father-in-law, William Biles.

References

Sources
 Jane Moon Snipes, "The Founding and Founder of the Falls Meeting", The Bulletin of Friends’ Historical Association, 1933.
Location of the First Generation Scarborough/Stackhouse in America

1632 births
1693 deaths
17th-century Christian clergy
17th-century Quakers
American Christian pacifists
American people of English descent
American city founders
Converts to Quakerism
Deaths from smallpox
English Christian pacifists
English Dissenters
English Quakers
Infectious disease deaths in Pennsylvania
Members of the Pennsylvania Provincial Council
People of colonial Pennsylvania
People from Yardley, Pennsylvania
People from Leek, Staffordshire
Quaker ministers
Quakers from Pennsylvania
English emigrants